The 1974–75 Montenegrin Republic League was the 30th season of Montenegrin Republic League. The season started in August 1974 and finished in May 1975.

Season 

Just like during the previous year, in Montenegrin Republic League played 16 teams. Among the teams which didn't play on previous season were OFK Titograd (relegated from Yugoslav Second League) and three best teams from Regional leagues - Partizan Momišići, Arsenal and Ivangrad.
After 30 weeks, the title won Titograd, with seven points more than second-placed Zeta.

Table

Higher leagues 
On season 1974–75, four Montenegrin teams played in higher leagues of SFR Yugoslavia. All of them (Sutjeska, Budućnost, Lovćen and Bokelj) participated in 1974–75 Yugoslav Second League.

See also 
 Montenegrin Republic League
Montenegrin Republic Cup (1947–2006)
Montenegrin clubs in Yugoslav football competitions (1946–2006)
Montenegrin Football Championship (1922–1940)

References 

1974-75
1974–75 in Yugoslav football
1974–75 in European third tier association football leagues